Francis Charles French, 6th Baron De Freyne DL (15 January 1884 – 24 December 1935) was an Anglo-Irish hereditary peer; he was a member of the House of Lords of the United Kingdom, and the Senate of Southern Ireland.

He was the son of Arthur French, 4th Baron de Freyne of Coolavin and Marie Georgiana Lamb. He married Lina Victoria Arnott, daughter of Major Sir John Alexander Arnott, 2nd Bt. and Caroline Sydney Williams, on 28 February 1916. He died at his home French Park, Frenchpark on 24 December 1935 at age 51.

He inherited the title Baron de Freyne in 1915. He was Deputy Lieutenant of County Roscommon and was also the High Sheriff in the County in 1912.

Lord de Freyne had one son; Francis Arthur John French, 7th Baron de Freyne of Coolavin (1927–2009).

Arms

References

External links
 

1884 births
1935 deaths
Barons in the Peerage of the United Kingdom
Deputy Lieutenants of Roscommon
Members of the Senate of Southern Ireland
High Sheriffs of Roscommon
Younger sons of barons